The Stuart Highlanders is a pipe band based in Massachusetts, competing in Grade 5 which formerly also had a Grade 1 band.

The Grade 1 band had been Grade 2, and was promoted to Grade 1 in 2014 after merging with the Oran Mor Pipe Band.

References

External links

Grade 1 pipe bands
Performing groups established in 1964